Berry Events Center is a 4,300-seat multi-purpose arena in Marquette, Michigan, in the United States that opened in 1999. It is home to the Northern Michigan University Wildcats ice hockey and basketball teams.  The arena formerly housed the US short track speed skating team. It was built in 1999, and is named for John W. Berry, Jr., class of 1971, a primary benefactor of the facility.  The arena replaced Lakeview Arena, the home of Wildcat hockey for its first twenty-three seasons.

The arena contains 16 luxury suites and standing room for 400 fans.  It is also the premier sports and entertainment venue in the Upper Peninsula, accommodating up to 5,675 for concerts.

It is the only school in the Central Collegiate Hockey Association to have Olympic-size ice.

External links
 2005-06 Northern Michigan University Hockey Guide

College ice hockey venues in the United States
Basketball venues in Michigan
Sports venues completed in 1999
1999 establishments in Michigan
Indoor ice hockey venues in Michigan
Buildings and structures in Marquette, Michigan